Denmark Township may refer to the following places in the United States:

 Denmark Township, Michigan
 Denmark Township, Minnesota
 Denmark Township, Ashtabula County, Ohio